Craven Park is a rugby league stadium in Barrow-in-Furness, Cumbria, England. It is the home of Barrow Raiders rugby league team.

Rugby league
Craven Park was built in 1931, largely as a result of the efforts of supporters of Barrow RLFC, 500 of whom volunteered to construct the ground. The total cost of the building project came to £7,500 which was an unbelievable figure in those days.

The stadium was named after Commander G. W. Craven, a local war hero, who had started the appeal fund with a donation of £500. It should not be confused with Craven Park, or Old Craven Park in Hull, other rugby league venues.

As of 2022, the capacity of Craven Park stands at only 6,000.

Matches between either Barrow or Cumbria against touring international rugby league sides included:

Greyhound racing
Independent (unaffiliated to a governing body) greyhound racing took place around Craven Park from 1932–1933.

References

Rugby league stadiums in England
Rugby League World Cup stadiums
Barrow-in-Furness
Craven Park
Sports venues completed in 1931
Defunct greyhound racing venues in the United Kingdom
American football venues in the United Kingdom